Catherine Adipo (also referred to as Catherine Constance Adipo and Catherine Adipo Wejuli) is a Ugandan sportswoman, sports administrator and the first female FIFA referee in Uganda as well as East and Central Africa.

Background and education 
Adipo is one of 16 children born to the late Reverend Canon Kezironi Wejuli and Abisiagi Wejuli.

Adipo attended Busia Integrated School, Mt.St.Mary's College, Namagunga and King's College Budo. She graduated from Makerere University with a Bachelor of Arts Degree in Geography and Languages in 1987. She also holds a Post Graduate Diploma in Education still from Makerere University and a Master's degree in Sports science from Kyambogo University.

Career

Playing career 

 Featured as a centre for local volleyball club Kampala Amateur Volleyball Club (KAVC)
 1982 - National Ladies team captain (Volleyball)

Professional career 

 1988 - Games Mistress and Football Coach, Makerere College School
 1989 - Undergoes referee training and joins Uganda Referees Association
 1995 - Attains FIFA Badge thus becoming first woman FIFA referee in Uganda
 1991- 1997 - Sports Officer, Kampala City Council
 2005 - Lecturer, Physical Science, Kyambogo University
 2006 - date - FIFA/CAF Instructor
 2015 - FUFA Referees Standing Committee Vice Chairperson

Notable achievements and appearances 

 1995 - First Ugandan Woman FIFA Referee
 2000 - Referee, 2000 African Women's Championship, South Africa
 2002 - Referee, 2002 African Women's Championship, Nigeria
 2003 - Centre Referee, CAF Second Round, Women Olympic Football Qualifier between Angola and Zimbabwe
 2004 - Referee, 2004 African Women's Championship, South Africa

Controversy 
In 2011, it was alleged that while still a lecturer at Kyambogo University, Adipo had travelled to China on a Uganda Olympics Committee ticket to represent the organisation yet she was not a member of the said organisation.

Personal life 
Adipo is married and has 2 children

References 

Ugandan sportswomen
21st-century Ugandan women
Ugandan sportspeople
Year of birth missing (living people)
Living people